Anthony Murphy may refer to:

 Anthony Murphy (artist) (born 1956), English painter and child-actor
 Anthony Joseph Murphy (1913–1996), Newfoundland politician
 Tony Murphy (cricketer) (born 1962), English cricketer